Thalkirchen is a Munich U-Bahn station in the Munich borough of Thalkirchen, near the Tierpark Hellabrunn (Munich Zoo).

References

External links

Munich U-Bahn stations
Railway stations in Germany opened in 1989
1989 establishments in West Germany